Pope Clement IX (r. 1667–1669) created 12 cardinals in three consistories:

Consistory of 12 December 1667

 Giacomo Rospigliosi, nephew of the Pope– cardinal-priest of S. Sisto (received the title on 30 January 1668), then cardinal-priest of SS. Giovanni e Paolo (16 May 1672), †  2 February 1684
 Leopoldo de' Medici, brother of grand duke of Tuscany – cardinal-deacon of SS. Cosma e Damiano (received the title on 9 April 1668), then cardinal-deacon of S. Maria in Cosmedin (14 May 1670), †  10 November 1675
 Sigismondo Chigi, O.S.Io.Hieros., grand prior of Rome – cardinal-deacon of S. Maria in Domnica (received the title on 30 January 1668), then cardinal-deacon of S. Giorgio in Velabro (19 May 1670), †  30 April 1678

Consistory of 5 August 1669

All the new cardinals received the titles on 19 May 1670.
 Emmanuel Théodose de la Tour d'Auvergne de Bouillon – cardinal-priest of S. Giovanni a Porta Latina, then cardinal-priest of S. Pietro in Vincoli (19 October 1676), cardinal-bishop of Albano (19 October 1689), cardinal-bishop of Porto e S. Rufina (21 July 1698), cardinal-bishop of Ostia e Velletri (15 December  1700), †  2 March 1715
 Luis Manuel Fernández de Portocarrero-Bocanegra y Moscoso-Osorio, dean of the cathedral chapter of Toledo ( in pectore, published on 29 November 1669) – cardinal-priest of S. Sabina, then cardinal-bishop of Palestrina (27 January 1698), †  14 September 1709

Consistory of 29 November 1669

All the new cardinals received the titles on 19 May 1670, except of Emilio Altieri, who on 29 April 1670 became Pope Clement X.
 Francesco Nerli (seniore), archbishop of Florence – cardinal-priest of S. Bartolomeo all'Isola, †  6 November 1670
 Emilio Bonaventura Altieri, prefect of the Pontifical Household – cardinal-priest without the title, on 29 April 1670 became Pope Clement X, †  22 July 1676
 Carlo Cerri, dean of the Sacred Roman Rota – cardinal-deacon of S. Adriano, †  14 May 1690
 Lazzaro Pallavicino – cardinal-deacon of S. Maria in Aquiro, then cardinal-priest of S. Balbina (8 November 1677), †  21 April 1680
 Giovanni Bona, O.Cist. – cardinal-priest of S. Bernardo alle Terme, †  28 October 1674
 Nicolò Acciaioli, auditor general of the Apostolic Chamber  – cardinal-deacon of SS. Cosma e Damiano, then cardinal-deacon of S. Maria in Via Lata (19 October 1689), cardinal-priest of S. Callisto (28 November 1689), cardinal-bishop of Frascati (28 September 1693), cardinal-bishop of Porto e S. Rufina (15 December  1700), cardinal-bishop of Ostia e Velletri (18 March 1715), †  23 February 1719
 Buonaccorso Buonaccorsi, general treasurer – cardinal-deacon of S. Maria della Scala, †  18 April 1678

References

External links

Clement IX
College of Cardinals
17th-century Catholicism
 
Pope Clement IX